Memorial: Letters from American Soldiers is a 1991 American short documentary film directed by Bill Couturié. It was nominated for an Academy Award for Best Documentary Short.  It shows footage from World War I, World War II, the Korean War, the Vietnam War and the Gulf War, overlaid with readings of letters from US troops fighting in each war.  The letters get read by Leo Downey, Robert Hegyes, Bill Irwin, Val Kilmer, James Naughton, Jim Tracy, Blair Underwood and Tom Hulce.

References

External links

, posted by editor Gary Weimberg

1991 documentary films
1991 films
1991 short films
American short documentary films
American independent films
1991 independent films
Films directed by Bill Couturié
1990s short documentary films
1990s English-language films
1990s American films